Rushian Marcus Amori Hepburn-Murphy (born 28 August 1998) is an English professional footballer who plays as a forward and currently plays for Swindon Town in the EFL League Two.

Club career

Aston Villa
Hepburn-Murphy is a product of the Aston Villa youth academy. On 14 March 2015, he made his league debut for Aston Villa, coming on as a substitute for the last seven minutes in place of Christian Benteke in the 4–0 away victory at Sunderland. At the age of 16 years and 176 days, he is the second youngest player in the club's history. He is also the youngest player to appear in a match for the club during the Premier League era.

Cambridge United (loan) 
On 11 January 2019, Hepburn-Murphy agreed to join Cambridge United on loan for the remainder of the season.

Tranmere Rovers (loan) 
On 2 August 2019, Hepburn-Murphy joined EFL League One  side Tranmere Rovers F.C.on a season-long loan. He made his debut as a 45th minute substitute in Tranmere's opening day 2–3 loss to Rochdale, picking up a 90th minute red card for violent conduct. On 2 November 2019, Hepburn-Murphy scored his first league goals for Tranmere, and his first ever career hattrick in a 3–1 victory over MK Dons. He returned to Aston Villa earlier than planned on 31 January 2020.

Derby County (loan) 
On 31 January 2020, Hepburn-Murphy joined Derby County on loan for the rest of the season.

On 25 June 2020, Hepburn-Murphy's loan at Derby was ended without him making an appearance, as he was released by Aston Villa.

Pafos
On 15 July 2020, Hepburn-Murphy joined Pafos in the Cypriot First Division. In his first outing for Pafos, Hepburn-Murphy scored 7 goals in a single pre-season friendly game, a 9–0 victory against a Riga FC XI. Hepburn-Murphy made his competitive debut on 22 August 2020, in a 2–2 home draw against Omonia.

On 7 January 2021, Hepburn-Murphy scored his first ever goal in the Cypriot First Division, in a 5–0 victory over Olympiakos Nicosia. 

Hepburn-Murphy was released at the end of the 2021–22 Cypriot First Division season, which he had missed the entirety of due to injury.

Swindon Town 
On 1 September 2022, Hepburn-Murphy returned to England, joining League Two club Swindon Town. He made his Swindon Town debut on 20 September 2022, scoring their only goal in a 3–1 home defeat to Plymouth Argyle in the EFL Trophy.

International career
On 29 November 2013, Hepburn-Murphy made his debut for England under-16s against Scotland, making subsequent under-17 appearances against Brazil, the United States, and Portugal.

Career statistics

Honours 
Aston Villa U23s

 Premier League Cup: 2017–18

References

External links

England profile at The FA
Rushian Hepburn-Murphy at avfc.co.uk

1998 births
Living people
Footballers from Birmingham, West Midlands
English footballers
England youth international footballers
English expatriate footballers
Association football forwards
Aston Villa F.C. players
Premier League players
English Football League players
Black British sportspeople
English people of Jamaican descent
Cambridge United F.C. players
Tranmere Rovers F.C. players
Derby County F.C. players
Expatriate footballers in Cyprus
English expatriate sportspeople
English expatriate sportspeople in Cyprus
Swindon Town F.C. players
Cypriot First Division players